Achintya (from Sanskrit: अचिन्त्य, "the inconceivable", "the unimaginable"), also known as Sang Hyang Widhi Wasa (Balinese: "The Divine Order") and Sang Hyang Tunggal ("The Divine Oneness"), is the Supreme God of Indonesian Hinduism (formally known as Agama Hindu Dharma), especially on the island of Bali. Achintya is equivalent to the metaphysical concept of Brahman of Indian Hinduism, and is the Supreme God in traditional wayang (shadow puppet) theatre. All gods, goddesses and existence are believed to be the manifestation of the Achintya in Balinese Hinduism.

Role

Achintya corresponds to a rather recent trend towards monism in Bali, according to which there is one supreme deity, and that all other gods are only manifestations of him. Achintya is emptiness, and considered as the origin of the Universe, all other divinities emanating from him.

He is often associated to the sun god, and depicted in human form with flames around him. His nakedness expresses that "his consciousness is no longer carried away by his sense-faculties".

Prayers and offerings are not made directly to Achintya, but also to the other manifestations of the deity. He is often not even represented, in which case he is only evoked by an empty throne on top of a pillar (the Padmasana, lit. "lotus throne"), inside Balinese temples.

The introduction of the Padmasana as an altar to the Supreme God, was the result of a 16th-century Hindu reformation movement, led by Dang Hyang Nirartha, the priest of the Gelgel King Batu Renggong (also Waturenggong), at the time when Islam was spreading from the west through Java. Dang Hyang Nirartha built temples in Bali, and added the Padmasana shrines to the temples he visited.

Political aspects

Since the end of World War II and the Indonesian War of Independence, the Republic of Indonesia has adopted the political philosophy of Pancasila (literally, "The five principles"), which allows for freedom of religion. The statute, however, requires that the religion in question be monotheistic, i.e., based upon the belief in a single, omnipotent deity. Under this system, six religions are recognised: Islam, Buddhism, Catholicism, Protestantism, Hinduism and later on Confucianism.
To comply with regulations, Balinese Hindus have felt the need to reinforce the monotheistic component of the faith, thus the more emphasised role of Achintya. To refer to him, they selected the term Sang Hyang Widhi Wasa (glossed as "God Almighty"), which although coined in the 1930s by Protestant missionaries to describe the Christian God, was thought to be well-adapted to describe the Hindu supreme deity. This is thus the name which is now more commonly used by modern Balinese.

See also
 Adi-Buddha
 Bhagavan
 Brahman
 Hinduism in Indonesia
 Hyang
 Ishvara
 Shen (Chinese religion)
 Tathāgata
 Tengri

References

Hindu gods
Hinduism in Bali
Indonesian gods
Names of God in Hinduism